Arthur Thomas (4 May 1869 – 28 April 1934) was an Australian cricketer. He played in one first-class match for South Australia in 1898/99.

See also
 List of South Australian representative cricketers

References

External links
 

1869 births
1934 deaths
Australian cricketers
South Australia cricketers
Cricketers from Adelaide